Bhavanarayana Temple is a temple in Bapatla of Bapatla district in the Indian state of Andhra Pradesh. The temple is dedicated to Lord Bhavanarayana and because of this temple the town of Bapatla got its name. It is one of the centrally protected monuments of national importance.

History 
The temple was constructed in 1265 by a chola king named Krimikantha Chola and was later restored.

References

External links 
 

Hindu temples in Guntur district
Hindu pilgrimage sites in India
Buildings and structures in Guntur district
Monuments of National Importance in Andhra Pradesh